John Villiers Villet (born 3 November 1954 in Ceres, Western Cape) is a former South African rugby union player.

Playing career
Villet made his provincial debut for Western Province in 1977. He however, only became a regular member of the Western Province team during the 1982 season as he and centres like Peter Whipp, Willie du Plessis, Colin Beck and others, were vying for places in the team. In 1982 Villet and Du Plessis formed a more regular partnership and were they part of the successful Currie Cup winning team.

Villet made his debut for the Springboks,  replacing Du Plessis (who retired at the end of 1982) as Danie Gerber's centre partner, against the touring England team on 2 June 1984 at the Boet Erasmus Stadium in Port Elizabeth. He also played in the second test against the English, but then suffered a serious knee injury, effectively stopping him from playing any further test matches.

Test history

See also
List of South Africa national rugby union players – Springbok no. 532

References

1954 births
Living people
South African rugby union players
South Africa international rugby union players
Western Province (rugby union) players
People from Ceres, Western Cape
Rugby union players from the Western Cape
Rugby union centres